The Tonga Mate Ma'a Tonga women's rugby league team, is under the former governing body TNRL. The very first Tonga womens team was in 2003 and known as the Mate Ma'a Tonga womens team administrated by the Tonga National Rugby League (TNRL) body. The newly formed Tonga women's national rugby league incorporated is under the Tongan Government with the national men's team. TNRL are no longer the national administrating body for Tonga Rugby League.

Players 
The following squad was announced on 17 June 2022 ahead of Tonga's match against  in Auckland on 25 June 2022. Just two of those named played in the November 2020 match against Niue. The side is coached by Marlin Dymock (head coach) and Jim Dymock (assistant). Tallies in the table include the June 2022 match against New Zealand.
 

Notes:
 m: matches, t: tries, g: goals.
 Lavinia Tauhalaliku played one match for New Zealand, against Samoa, in November 2020.
 Amelia Mafi played one match for the  Sydney Roosters in the 2020 NRL Women's season.
 Keisharn Hala played for the  Valkyries in the Queensland State competition 2021.
 Kalosipani Hopoate played for the  Sydney Roosters Indigenous Academy in the 2022 Tarsha Gale Cup.

Results

Full internationals

Nines

See also

Rugby league in Tonga
Tongan National Rugby League
Tonga national rugby league team
Tonga National Rugby League
History of the Tonga national rugby league team

References

External links

Women's national rugby league teams
Rugby league in Tonga